Fructoselysine is an Amadori adduct of glucose to lysine.

It breaks down into furosine on acid-catalysed hydrolysis. E. coli breaks it down using the enzymes fructoselysine-6-kinase and fructoselysine 6-phosphate deglycase into glucose 6-phosphate and lysine, a set of enzymes located on the frl (fructoselysine) operon.

References

Monosaccharide derivatives
Amino acid derivatives